Barkhetry Assembly constituency is one of the 126 assembly constituencies of Assam Legislative Assembly. Barkhetry forms part of the Gauhati Lok Sabha constituency.

Town Details

Country: India.
 State: Assam.
 District: Nalbari district
 Lok Sabha Constituency: Gauhati Lok Sabha/Parliamentary constituency.
 Assembly Categorisation: Rural
 Literacy Level: 79.89%.
 Eligible Electors as per 2021 General Elections:1,96,726 Eligible Electors. Male Electors:1,00,986. Female Electors:95,740.
 Geographic Co-Ordinates:   26°16’04.8"N 91°21’33.5"E.
 Total Area Covered: 445 square kilometres.
 Area Includes: Paschim Barkhetry, Madhyam Barkhetry, Pub-Barkhetry, Uttar Barkhetry and Upper Barbhag mouzas in Nalbari thana in Nalbari sub-division of Nalbari district of Assam.
 Inter State Border :Nalbari.
 Number Of Polling Stations: Year 2011-231,Year 2016-234,Year 2021-60.

Members of Legislative Assembly 

Following is the list of former members of Assam Legislative Assembly from Barkhetry:

 1978: Sheikh Chand Mohammad, Janata Party.
 1980: Sheikh Chand Mohammad, Indian National Congress.
 1985: Pulakesh Barua, Independent.
 1991: Bhumidhar Barman, Indian National Congress.
 1996: Pulakesh Barua, Asom Gana Parishad.
 2001: Bhumidhar Barman, Indian National Congress.
 2006: Bhumidhar Barman, Indian National Congress.
 2011: Bhumidhar Barman, Indian National Congress.
 2016: Narayan Deka, Bharatiya Janata Party.
2021: Diganta Barman, Indian National Congress.

Election results

2016 result

References

External links 
 

Assembly constituencies of Assam